This is a list of diseases starting with the letter "O".

O–Ob
 O Doherty syndrome
 O Donnell Pappas syndrome
 Obesophobia
 Obsessive–compulsive disorder (OCD)
 Obsessive–compulsive personality disorder
 Obstructive asymmetric septal hypertrophy
 Obstructive sleep apnea

Oc

Occ–Och
 Occipital horn syndrome
 Occlusive Infantile ateriopathy
 Occult spinal dysraphism
 Occupational asthma
 Occupational asthma - animals, insects and fungi
 Occupational asthma - chemicals and materials
 Occupational asthma - drugs and enzymes
 Occupational asthma - grains, flours, plants and gums
 Occupational asthma - isocyanates and metals
 Occupational asthma - wood
 OCD
 Ochoa syndrome
 Ochronosis, hereditary
 Ochronosis
 Ockelbo disease

Ocu

Ocul

Ocula
 Ocular albinism
 Ocular coloboma-imperforate anus
 Ocular convergence spasm
 Ocular histoplasmosis
 Ocular melanoma
 Ocular motility disorders
 Ocular toxoplasmosis

Oculo
 Oculo-auriculo-vertebral spectrum
 Oculo cerebral dysplasia
 Oculo cerebro acral syndrome
 Oculo cerebro osseous syndrome
 Oculo dento digital dysplasia
 Oculo digital syndrome
 Oculo facio cardio dental syndrome
 Oculo skeletal renal syndrome
 Oculo tricho anal syndrome
 Oculo tricho dysplasia

Oculoa–Oculog
 Oculoauriculofrontonasal syndrome
 Oculo-auriculo-vertebral dysplasia
 Oculocerebral hypopigmentation syndrome Cross type
 Oculocerebral hypopigmentation syndrome type Preus
 Oculocerebral syndrome with hypopigmentation
 Oculocerebrocutaneous syndrome
 Oculocerebrorenal syndrome
 Oculocutaneous albinism immunodeficiency
 Oculocutaneous albinism type 1
 Oculocutaneous albinism type 2
 Oculocutaneous albinism type 3
 Oculocutaneous albinism, tyrosinase negative
 Oculocutaneous albinism, tyrosinase positive
 Oculocutaneous tyrosinemia
 Oculodental syndrome Rutherfurd syndrome
 Oculodentodigital dysplasia dominant
 Oculodentodigital syndrome
 Oculo-dento-digital syndrome
 Oculodentoosseous dysplasia dominant
 Oculodentoosseous dysplasia recessive
 Oculodigitoesophagoduodenal syndrome
 Oculo-gastrointestinal muscular dystrophy

Oculom–Oculor
 Oculomaxillofacial dysostosis
 Oculomaxillofacial dysplasia with oblique facial clefts
 Oculomelic amyoplasia
 Oculomotor nerve palsy
 Oculopalatoskeletal syndrome
 Oculopharyngeal muscular dystrophy
 Oculorenocerebellar syndrome

Od–Ok
 Odonto onycho dysplasia with alopecia
 Odontoma
 Odontomicronychial dysplasia
 Odontoonychodermal dysplasia
 Odontophobia
 Odontotrichomelic hypohidrotic dysplasia
 OFD syndrome type 8
 OFD syndrome type Figuera
 Ogilvie's syndrome
 Ohaha syndrome
 Ohdo–Madokoro–Sonoda syndrome
 Oikophobia
 Okamuto–Satomura syndrome

Ol
 Olfactophobia
 Oligodactyly
 Oligodactyly tetramelia postaxial
 Oligomeganephronic renal hypoplasia
 Oligomeganephrony
 Oligophernia
 Oliver–McFarlane syndrome
 Oliver syndrome
 Olivopontocerebellar atrophy deafness
 Olivopontocerebellar atrophy type 1
 Olivopontocerebellar atrophy type 2
 Olivopontocerebellar atrophy type 3
 Olivopontocerebellar atrophy
 Ollier disease
 Olmsted syndrome
 Olney's lesions

Om–On
 Omenn syndrome
 Omodysplasia type 1
 Omodysplasia type 2
 Omphalocele cleft palate syndrome lethal
 Omphalocele exstrophy imperforate anus
 Omphalomesenteric cyst
 Omsk hemorrhagic fever
 Onat syndrome
 Onchocerciasis
 Oncocytoma
 Ondine's curse
 Oneirophobia
 Onychocryptosis
 Onychogryphosis
 Onycholysis
 Onychomadesis
 Onychomatricoma
 Onychomycosis
 Onychonychia hypoplastic distal phalanges
 Onychophosis
 Onychotrichodysplasia and neutropenia

Op

Opi-Ops
 Opioid dependence
 Opioid-induced hyperalgesia
 Ophthalmic icthyosis
 Ophthalmo acromelic syndrome
 Ophthalmomandibulomelic dysplasia
 Ophthalmophobia
 Ophthalmoplegia ataxia hypoacusis
 Ophthalmoplegia mental retardation lingua scrotalis
 Ophthalmoplegia myalgia tubular aggregates
 Ophthalmoplegia progressive external scoliosis
 Opitz–Mollica–Sorge syndrome
 Opitz–Reynolds–Fitzgerald syndrome
 Opitz syndrome
 Opportunistic infections
 Oppositional defiant disorder
 Opsismodysplasia

Opt
 Optic atrophy ophthalmoplegia ptosis deafness myopia
 Optic atrophy polyneuropathy deafness
 Optic atrophy, autosomal dominant
 Optic atrophy, idiopathic, autosomal recessive
 Optic atrophy
 Optic disc drusen
 Optic nerve coloboma with renal disease
 Optic nerve disorder
 Optic nerve hypoplasia, familial bilateral
 Optic neuritis
 Optic pathway glioma
 Opticoacoustic nerve atrophy dementia

Or

Ora–Orn
 Oral facial digital syndrome type 3
 Oral facial digital syndrome type 4
 Oral facial digital syndrome
 Oral facial dyskinesia
 Oral leukoplakia
 Oral lichen planus
 Oral lichenoid lesions
 Oral squamous cell carcinoma
 Oral submucous fibrosis
 Oral-facial cleft
 Oral-facial-digital syndrome, type IV
 Oral-facial-digital syndrome
 Oral-pharyngeal disorders
 Organic brain syndrome
 Organic mood syndrome
 Organic personality syndrome
 Organophosphate poisoning
 Ornithine aminotransferase deficiency
 Ornithine carbamoyl phosphate deficiency
 Ornithine transcarbamylase deficiency, hyperammonemia due to
 Ornithinemia
 Ornithosis

Oro–Ort
 Oro acral syndrome
 Orofaciodigital syndrome Gabrielli type
 Orofaciodigital syndrome Shashi type
 Orofaciodigital syndrome Thurston type
 Orofaciodigital syndrome type 2
 Orofaciodigital syndrome type1
 Orotic aciduria hereditary
 Orotic aciduria purines-pyrimidines
 Orotidylic decarboxylase deficiency
 Orstavik Lindemann Solberg syndrome
 Orthostatic intolerance

Os

Ose–Oss
 Osebold–Remondini syndrome
 Osgood–Schlatter disease
 OSLAM syndrome
 Osmed syndrome
 Ossicular malformations, familial

Ost

Oste

Ostei
 Osteitis deformans

Osteo
osteo: bone

Osteoa–Osteom
 Osteoarthritis
 Osteoarthropathy of fingers familial
 Osteochondritis deformans juvenile
 Osteochondritis dissecans
 Osteochondritis
 Osteochondrodysplasia thrombocytopenia hydrocephalus
 Osteochondroma
 Osteocraniostenosis
 Osteodysplasia familial Anderson type
 Osteodysplastic dwarfism Corsello type
 Osteoectasia familial
 Osteogenesis Imperfecta
 Osteogenesis imperfecta congenita microcephaly and cataracts
 Osteogenesis imperfecta congenital joint contractures
 Osteogenesis imperfecta retinopathy
 Osteogenic sarcoma
 Osteoglophonic dwarfism
 Osteolysis hereditary multicentric
 Osteolysis syndrome recessive
 Osteomalacia
 Osteomyelitis
osteocytes

Osteon–Osteos
 Osteonecrosis
 Osteopathia condensans disseminata with osteopoikilosis
 Osteopathia striata cranial sclerosis
 Osteopathia striata pigmentary dermopathy white forelock
 Osteopetrosis autosomal dominant type 1
 Osteopetrosis lethal
 Osteopetrosis renal tubular acidosis
 Osteopetrosis, (generic term)
 Osteopetrosis, malignant
 Osteopetrosis, mild autosomal recessive form
 Osteopoikilosis
 Osteoporosis macrocephaly mental retardation blindness
 Osteoporosis oculocutaneous hypopigmentation syndrome
 Osteoporosis pseudoglioma syndrome
 Osteoporosis
 Osteosarcoma limb anomalies erythroid macrocytosis
 Osteosclerose type Stanescu
 Osteosclerosis abnormalities of nervous system and meninges
 Osteosclerosis autosomal dominant Worth type
 Osteosclerosis
 Osteocytes

Oster
 Ostertag type amyloidosis

Ot–Ox
 Ota–Appaura syndrome
 Ota–Kawamura–Ito syndrome
 Oto-palato-digital syndrome type I and II
 Otodental syndrome
 Otofaciocervical syndrome
 Otoonychoperoneal syndrome
 Oto-Palatal-digital syndrome
 Otopalatodigital syndrome type 2
 Otosclerosis, familial
 Otosclerosis
 Otospondylomegaepiphyseal dysplasia
 Ouvrier–Billson syndrome
 Ovarian cancer
 Ovarian carcinosarcoma
 Ovarian dwarfism as part of Turner syndrome
 Ovarian dwarfism
 Ovarian insufficiency due to FSH resistance
 ovarian remnant syndrome
 Overfolded helix
 Overgrowth radial ray defect arthrogryposis
 Overgrowth syndrome type Fryer
 Overhydrated hereditary stomatocytosis
 Overwhelming post-splenectomy infection (OPSI)
 Oxalosis

O